Common Sense is the debut studio album by British rapper J Hus. It was released on 12 May 2017 by Black Butter Records, distributed by Sony Music, for digital download and CD purchase. The album features production from long-time collaborator Jae5, along with guest appearances from MoStack, Mist, Tiggs da Author and Burna Boy.

Common Sense debuted at number six on the UK Albums Chart and received widespread acclaim from critics. It is certified Gold by the British Phonographic Industry (BPI). The lead single, "Did You See", peaked at number nine on the UK Singles Chart, becoming J Hus' highest-charting single. Complex ranked it number one on the UK's Best Albums of 2017.

Background
Throughout 2015 and 2016, J Hus released a variety of singles, including "Lean & Bop", "Friendly" and "Playing Sports", along with the debut mixtape The 15th Day (2015), subsequently building a strong online presence.

In early April 2017, J Hus announced the track listing and release date for his debut album, Common Sense.

Singles
The promotional single "Friendly" was released for digital download on 1 January 2016 after initially being premiered on SoundCloud.

The lead single "Did You See" was released on 2 March 2017, along with its music video. The song peaked at number 9 so far on the UK Singles Chart, becoming J Hus' first chart entry and highest-charting song.

Critical reception

Upon release, Common Sense received widespread acclaim from critics. Kate Hutchinson of The Guardian praised Hus' blend of musical genres: "J Hus leads a wave of MCs who blend the genre’s hard-hitting, distinctly UK flow with bashment and Afrobeat. Hus show that mix’s true breadth, from playful braggadocio about partying, chasing girls and being, as one song title has it, the "Bouf Daddy", to introspective moments such as Spirit, on which loopy synths and polyrhythmic brilliance meet Hus's weary-sounding motivational speaker. The sound of the summer? You know it makes sense."

Will Pritchard of Clash stated: "This sound now has an album to pin to the mast. It’ll soundtrack this summer, but don’t be fooled into thinking that its time will be up by September. It’s just common sense." Ludovic Hunter-Tilney of Financial Times commented: "The music is a rich blend of styles, in which hip-hop, R&B, dancehall and Afrobeats suggest not only Hus’s versatility but also a world of expanding horizons."

Paul A. Thompson of Pitchfork commented: "The shifting musical styles underscore Hus’ own versatility; he flits from a lilting sing-song to something more gruff and guttural easily and without hesitation", concluding Common Sense is "an excellent debut from an artist on the cusp."

Accolades
Common Sense was acknowledged in numerous year-end lists in 2017, particularly by international publishers.

Commercial performance 
Common Sense debuted at number six on the UK Albums Chart and also entered the Dutch Album Top 100 and the Scottish Albums Chart. It is certified Gold by the British Phonographic Industry (BPI).

Track listing

Charts

Weekly charts

Year-end charts

Certifications

Release history

References

2017 debut albums
J Hus albums
Albums produced by Steel Banglez
Black Butter Records albums